The generic forms of Hong Kong place names are mainly Cantonese, Hakka and British English, although other languages also contribute to Hong Kong place names.

The majority of generic forms are suffix such as Chung in Kwai Chung. Some indicators of ordering and direction could be as prefixes, for example, Tai Pai (大白, lit. first white), Yi Pai (二白, second white).

Change in name
It is common that Cantonese place names change Chinese characters of similar pronunciation because of misinterpretation by mandarins or visitors from foreign villages and cities, illiteracy of local villages, seeking of good fortune and replace of  disgusting meanings.

List of generic names

Indigenous

English
Most common Chinese translation in brackets.

Modern
Most common Chinese translation in brackets.
 Centre (中心)
 Court (苑)
 Estate (邨)
 Plaza (廣場)
 Shopping centre (商場)

See also

Origins of names of cities and towns in Hong Kong
List of generic forms in place names in Great Britain and Ireland

References

Hong Kong, Place names of
 
Place name etymologies
Lists of place name etymologies